Caruso is a crater on Mercury.  Its name was adopted by the International Astronomical Union (IAU) on 
December 16, 2013. Caruso is named for the Italian singer Enrico Caruso.

The larger crater Boethius is east of Caruso.

References

Impact craters on Mercury